João Paulo Neto Martins (born 30 June 1988) is a Portuguese former professional footballer who played as a midfielder.

Club career
Born in Oliveira do Hospital, Coimbra District, Martins played most of his youth football with Sporting CP, having arrived at the club's academy in 2000 at the age of 12. From 2007 to 2009 he would be loaned to three teams, C.D. Olivais e Moscavide and Atlético Clube de Portugal in the third division and S.C. Olhanense in the second (one league match during the entire season for the latter side).

Released by Sporting in summer 2009, Martins resumed his career mainly in the third tier. He returned to division two in the 2012–13 campaign, signing for Associação Naval 1º de Maio.

International career
All youth levels comprised, Martins won 50 caps for Portugal and scored three goals. His first for the under-21 team arrived on 18 November 2008, when he played the last 25 minutes of the 4−1 friendly win over Spain in Cartaxo.

Personal life
Martins' older brother, Carlos, was also a footballer and a midfielder. He also graduated from Sporting's youth system but with much more individual success, going on to also represent S.L. Benfica and Portugal.

References

External links

1988 births
Living people
People from Oliveira do Hospital
Sportspeople from Coimbra District
Portuguese footballers
Association football midfielders
Primeira Liga players
Liga Portugal 2 players
Segunda Divisão players
Sporting CP footballers
S.C. Olhanense players
C.D. Olivais e Moscavide players
Atlético Clube de Portugal players
Gil Vicente F.C. players
F.C. Vizela players
C.D. Mafra players
Associação Naval 1º de Maio players
Académico de Viseu F.C. players
F.C. Penafiel players
Portugal youth international footballers
Portugal under-21 international footballers